Circolo Nautico Posillipo is an Italian water polo club from Naples established in 1925. It is one of the most laureated Italian clubs, having won three Euroleague, one Cup Winners' Cup and eleven Italian Championships between 1985 and 2005.

Titles
 Euroleague (3)
 1997, 1998, 2005
 Euro Cup (1)
 2015
 Cup Winners' Cup (2)
 1988, 2003
 LEN Super Cup
 2005
 Serie A1 (11)
 1985, 1986, 1988, 1989, 1993, 1994, 1995, 1996, 2000, 2001, 2004
 Coppa Italia (1)
 1987

Famous players
 Tamás Kásás 
 Fabio Bencivenga 
 Fabrizio Buonocore 
 Fabio Galasso
 Andrea Scotti Galletta
 Fabio Galasso
 Valentino Gallo 
 Luigi Di Costanzo 
  Antracite Lignano
  Mino Marsili
  Domenico Mattiello
  Massimiliano Migliaccio
  Franco Pizzabiocca
 Francesco Postiglione 
  Alfredo Riccitiello
  Paride Saccola
 Carlo Silipo 
  Dario Vasaturo
 Fabio Violetti
 Ratko Štritof 
 Andro Bušlje 
 Nikola Janović 
 Boris Zloković 
 Dušan Popović 
  Milan Tadić
 Vanja Udovičić
 Angelos Vlachopoulos
 Fabio Violetti

References

External links
Official website

Water polo clubs in Italy
Sport in Naples
Sports clubs established in 1925